Robert P. Baldwin (October 19, 1917 – April 7, 1994) spent his career in the Army Air Forces and the United States Air Force. He was a pilot during World War II and the Korean War, becoming a flying ace in Korea, shooting down five enemy aircraft.

Military career

World War II
Robert Baldwin  entered the Aviation Cadet Program of the U.S. Army Air Corps on September 28, 1939, and was commissioned a second lieutenant and awarded his pilot wings at Kelly Field, Texas, on June 22, 1940. During the war, he took part in 75 combat missions, flying P-38s and P-40s in Europe from 1943 to 1945. in May 1945 he was a lieutenant colonel, commanding the 71st Fighter Squadron based at March Field, California.

Korean War chronology
In 1948, Col. Robert Baldwin served as a military observer in Palestine. From December 1948 to July 1949, he server as Assistant Deputy for Maintenance and Chief of Flight Operations at Headquarters Oklahoma City Air Material Area at Tinker AFB, Oklahoma. From July to December 1949, he attended Air Command and Staff College at Maxwell AFB, Alabama. He then became commander of the 56th Maintenance and Support Group at Selfridge Air Force Base, Michigan until March 1950. Following that, he served Deputy for Operations of the 56th Fighter-Interceptor Wing, also at Selfridge AFB. In June 1951, he became Staff of Headquarters Air Defense Command at Ent Air Force Base, Colorado until February 1953. At that point, he joined the 51st Fighter-Interceptor Wing in Korea and was promoted to Commander after 3 missions. He flew a total of 85 combat missions, and had 800 hours on the F-86. He achieved 5 aerial victories plus 3 damaged in the Korean War.

Cold War chronology
From September 1953 until June 1955, he was commander of Kisarazu Air Base in Japan. Following that, he served as commander of the 4750th Air Defense Group at Vincent AFB, Arizona. In November 1958, he was stationed at the U.S. Air Force Headquarters in the Pentagon. In June 1962, he served as staff of Headquarters Allied Air Forces Southern Europe. In July 1965, he served his final assignment as Assistant Deputy Chief of Staff for Plans with Headquarters Air Training Command at Randolph AFB, Texas. He retired from the service in June 1966.

Decorations

Baldwin was awarded the following decorations for his military service.

Silver Star citation

See also 
List of Korean War flying aces

References

Sources

American Korean War flying aces
Aviators from California
Recipients of the Silver Star
Recipients of the Legion of Merit
Recipients of the Distinguished Flying Cross (United States)
United States Air Force officers
United States Army Air Forces pilots of World War II
1917 births
1994 deaths
Burials at Fort Rosecrans National Cemetery
Recipients of the Air Medal
Military personnel from California